Jonás Gómez Gallo (12 July 1923 – 24 June 2019) was a Chilean businessman and politician who served as Deputy and Senator.

References

1923 births
2019 deaths
Members of the Chamber of Deputies of Chile
Members of the Senate of Chile
Radical Party of Chile politicians
20th-century Chilean politicians